The Magnificat Meal Movement International (MMMI) was formed in 1986 as a "missionary" offshoot of the 'Celtic Corma Adoration' group of Australia, which was founded in Melbourne in 1976 by J. Phelan, F. Eaton, D. Burslem and E. Burslem. The original name, "Celtic Adorers", was chosen by J. Phelan. This name changed in the early 1990s.  The Magnificat Meal Movement is regarded by mainstream Christian churches as a cult.  Debra Burslem, its most prominent ongoing leader, now lives in Vanuatu which some claim is for the purpose of avoiding the Australian Federal Police on multiple charges of embezzlement and tax fraud.

Aims

The group describes its aims as primarily prayer, service and the study of seeking the truth as revealed through the light of the "Celtic Corma Adoration" (CCA) research.

Beliefs

The Magnificat Meal Movement International seeks to maintain the "original light teachings established by Yashua Jesus."  The CCA and the MMMI recognize the 1st-century church teachings established by the Marys and Joseph of Arimathea and the original teachings of Celtic followers of the "way" in the Celtic realm of Britain in the first century.

The CCA and the MMMI have a Levitical priesthood and the global church-basilica is made up of churches throughout the world. Adherents believe that salvation is through unity with the 'living one' by being united with the identity of Yashua Jesus. The CCA and the MMMI do not believe in the "End Times" or Millennial-type teachings, but advocate that we are living already in a "New Galactic Era".

The most publicized home-basilica-church and teaching center for the CCA and its offshoot, the MMMI, is based in Helidon, a small town about 130 km west of Brisbane in the Lockyer Valley just east of Toowoomba in Queensland, Australia.

Both the CCA and the MMMI emphasise Marian-style study and application of the Gospel of Mary.  Mary is honored as an example of co-operation of the creature with the Divine.  All adherents are encouraged to live a similar lifestyle of divine co-operation as they feel and study such writings as the Gospel of Mary.

Humanitarian work

Humanitarian work and service to others, is also important to both the CCA and the MMMI missionary offshoot, as a work of being united like 'Slaves of Love' for humanity as outlined in the 'Gospel of Thomas' Nag Hammadi Library.  Most MMMI and CCA and various other support groups are involved in extensive works of prayer, unity and service to humanity which they each finance from their own businesses.

Connection with Roman Catholic Church

The Celtic Corma Adorers (CCA) Church, or the Magnificat Meal Movement International (MMMI) has been characterised as an offshoot of the Roman Catholic Church, having been excommunicated and barred from the Eucharist by the Catholic Bishop of Toowoomba, Bill Morris, who has made repeated statements distancing the Roman Catholic Church from the movement.

Though the followers of the movement presently deny any past connection to the Roman Catholic Church, the word 'Meal' within the name of the movement referred originally to the sharing of the Eucharist. The group was initially very involved in reviving the practice of Eucharistic Adoration in Catholic parishes, and Debra Burslem, the self-proclaimed Prophetess of the movement, publicly affirmed her affiliation with the Roman Catholic Church and claims to have received support from Catholic priest Fr. Jack Salisbury.

The movement was initially predominantly made up of traditionalist and conservative Novus Ordo Roman Catholic parishioners who had rejected the post-Vatican II changes to the Catholic Church and announced in the late 1990s that the Novus Ordo Mass was invalid. After being ostracized and denounced by the Latin Rite hierarchy in Queensland, the Melkite Catholic Eparchy of St Michael, Archangel began to support the movement, the Melkite bishop discreetly providing priests to perform church functions for members. The Catholics involved in the movement who did not join an Eastern Catholic church secretly began attending traditional Latin services, either within the Society of Saint Pius X or local Catholic parishes with a blessing to perform the Tridentine Mass.

Other matters

CORMA
CORMA stands for Co-Redemptorist, Mediatrix of All Graces and Advocate, the title by which the movement prefers to refer to Mary.

Commonwealth of Caledonia Australis
MMM have placed signs on some of their properties claiming to be part of The Commonwealth of Caledonia Australis.

A MMM member has attempted to use CCA citizenship to avoid charges relating to vehicular offenses, denying the authority of the Courts.

Related corporate entities
Our Lady's Mount—holds stakes in hundreds of thousands of dollars worth of property deeded to them by MMM members.

Corpus Christi International—educational publishing company and sometime sponsor/coordinator of MMM affiliate youth events.

References

External links
Magnificat Meal Movement website
Catholic Diocese of Toowoomba Official Church Statements regarding the Magnificat Meal Movement.
Magnificat Meal Movement listing at www.christian-index.com
Slaves of the Eucharist, an ABC-Australia program

Christianity in Australia